WBAN (1340 AM) is a radio station broadcasting an adult contemporary format. Licensed to Veazie, Maine, United States, the station serves the Bangor area.  The station is owned by Port Broadcasting, LLC, and features programming from Fox News Radio.

History

WBAN originally signed on in 2002 as WNZS, simulcasting CNN Headline News but gradually added Salem Radio Network talk show hosts Bill Bennett's Morning in America, The Laura Ingraham Show, Mike Gallagher and Michael Medved. In 2011, co-owned WGUY signed on the air and began simulcasting WNZS. In March 2012, the station began simulcast on FM translator W231CH 94.1, which had previously simulcasted WWNZ. The FM translator switched to a simulcast of WGUY in May 2012, when that station flipped formats to Oldies. In late 2014, the Salem Radio Network programming moved to WWNZ, with WNZS picking up WWNZ's Fox News Radio programming. As a talk station it also rebroadcast the newscasts from Bangor's ABC affiliate WVII.

In the summer of 2015, the station added an FM translator on 106.1, W291CO, however in early 2016 the translator was sold to Maine Public Broadcasting Network. The station changed its call sign to the current WBAN on July 27, 2016. In December 2016, Pine Tree Broadcasting announced that its stations would be sold to Port Broadcasting (owners of WWSF, WNBP and WXEX-FM/WXEX) with WBAN inheriting the soft AC format from WGUY and WGUY reverting to back to its oldies format it had carried previous to Pine Tree Broadcasting's ownership. 94.1 W231CH, which had rebroadcast WGUY and its soft AC format, began rebroadcasting WBAN. NASCAR programming moved to WCYR.

Previous logo

References

External links

BAN
Mainstream adult contemporary radio stations in the United States
Mass media in Penobscot County, Maine
Radio stations established in 2002
2002 establishments in Maine